The Budapesti Közlekedési Központ (BKK), officially Budapesti Közlekedési Központ Zrt., is the largest public transport company in Budapest and one of the largest in Europe. It was founded on January 1, 2011. BKK operates buses (200+ lines, 40 night lines), trams (33 lines), and trolleybuses (15 lines).

History 
The last major transport change of Budapest was the foundation of BKV in the 1960s. The foundation of BKK was decided on October 27, 2010 by the General Assembly of Budapest. They appointed Dávid Vitézy as CEO.

From May 1, 2012 BKK began to do many functions of BKV:
 Operating public transportation, planning network, lines and time schedules
 Making public service contracts with BKV and other companies
 Upgrading transportation and planning ideas for upgrading
 Tickets and passes selling and securing

Transportation

Buses 

BKK operates over 200 bus lines and 40 night bus lines. The first bus line number is 5. The main bus lines do not have letters in their respective route numbers.

Bus lines which always operate in low-floor service:

5, 7, 7G, 8E, 9, 11, 13, 13A, 15, 16, 16A, 16B, 21, 21A, 22, 22A, 25, 26, 29, 31, 32, 33, 34, 35, 36, 38, 38A, 39, 40, 40B, 40E, 44, 45, 46, 53, 55, 57, 58, 63, 64, 64A, 65, 65A, 66, 66B, 67, 68, 71, 84E, 84M, 87, 88, 88A, 88B, 89E, 91, 92, 92A, 93, 93A, 94E, 94M, 95, 96, 97E, 98, 100E, 101B, 101E, 102, 103, 104, 104A, 105, 106, 108E, 111, 112, 113, 113A, 114, 115, 116, 117, 118, 119, 120, 121, 122, 124, 125, 126, 126A, 128, 129, 130, 131, 133E, 134, 135, 137, 138, 140, 140A, 140B, 141, 143, 144, 146, 147, 148, 149, 150, 151, 152, 153, 154, 154B, 155, 156, 157, 157A, 158, 159, 160, 164, 165, 166, 168E, 169E, 170, 172, 173, 174, 175, 178, 179, 181, 182, 183, 184, 185, 186, 187, 188, 188E, 191, 194, 194B, 194M, 195, 196, 196A, 197, 198, 199, 200E, 204, 212, 213, 214, 217, 218, 219, 220, 222, 223M, 224, 226, 230, 231, 236, 236A, 237, 238, 240, 241A, 243, 250, 250B, 251A, 254M, 257, 260, 262, 264, 266, 270, 272, 277, 278, 279, 279B, 280, 280B, 281, 287, 291, 294E, 294M, 296, 296A, 297, 298.

Night lines: 901, 907, 908, 909, 914, 914A, 916, 918, 922, 923, 930, 931, 934, 937, 938, 940, 941, 943, 948, 950, 950A, 956, 960, 963, 964, 966, 968, 972, 972B, 973, 979, 979A, 980, 990, 992, 994, 996, 996A, 998, 999.

External links

Public transport companies in Hungary